Mina Sundwall (born October 23, 2001) is an American actress best known for portraying Penny Robinson in the 2018 Netflix television series Lost in Space.

Biography
Sundwall was born on October 24, 2001, in New York City. with Swedish and Italian parents. In 2012 she made her first appearance on television in a season 4 episode of Celebrity Ghost Stories. She appeared in Law & Order: Special Victims Unit in 2014. In 2015, she acted in the romantic comedy-drama Maggie's Plan, the drama Freeheld, and the horror film #Horror.  She played the role of Penny Robinson in the Netflix series Lost in Space, which first aired in April 2018.

In May 2022, Sundwall joined the cast of thriller podcast series Jane Anonymous, based on the novel of the same name by Laurie Faria Stolarz.

Filmography

Film

Video games

References

External links  

2001 births
American film actresses
Living people
21st-century American actresses
American television actresses
Actresses from New York City